The 214th Coastal Division was an infantry division of the Royal Italian Army during World War II. Royal Italian Army coastal divisions were second line divisions formed with reservists and equipped with second rate materiel. They were often commanded by officers called out of retirement.

History 
The division was activated on 1 July 1943 in Bari and received units from the 212th Coastal Division and XXXI Coastal Brigade. The division was assigned to XXXI Army Corps and had its headquarter in Santa Severina. The division was responsible for the coastal defense of the coast of the Ionian Sea coast of Calabria between Botricello and Lido Sant'Angelo.

In early September the division prepared to fight the British XIII Corps, which had landed on 3 September 1943 in southern Calabria in Operation Baytown and was advancing towards the 214th Coastal Division's positions. After the Armistice of Cassibile was announced on 8 September 1943 the division remained at its positions and surrendered to the British XIII Corps. Afterwards the division joined the Italian Co-belligerent Army, but did not participate in the Italian campaign. The division was dissolved in summer 1944.

Organization 
 214th Coastal Division, in Santa Severina
 103rd Coastal Regiment (transferred from the 212th Coastal Division)
 CCCXLII Coastal Battalion
 VI Dismounted Squadrons Group/ Regiment "Lancieri di Novara"
 148th Coastal Regiment
 3x Coastal battalions
 CCCXCVI Coastal Battalion
 XXVII Coastal Artillery Group
 LV Coastal Artillery Group
 LXXXI Coastal Artillery Group
 CXL Coastal Artillery Group
 403rd Mortar Company (81mm Mod. 35 mortars)
 702nd Mixed Engineer Company
 178th Anti-paratroopers Unit
 312th Anti-paratroopers Unit
 443rd Anti-paratroopers Unit
 447th Anti-paratroopers Unit
 451st Anti-paratroopers Unit
 214th Carabinieri Section
 Field Post Office
 Division Services

Attached to the division:
 Armored Train 152/3/T, in Crotone (4x 152/40 naval guns, 4x 20/77 anti-aircraft guns; transferred from the 212th Coastal Division)

Commanding officers 
The division's commanding officers were:

 Generale di Brigata Carlo Lama (1 July 1943 - ?)

References 

 
 

Coastal divisions of Italy
Infantry divisions of Italy in World War II